William Elmsall (fl. 1386–1399), of Grimsby, Lincolnshire, was an English politician.

He was a Member (MP) of the Parliament of England for Great Grimsby in 1386, 1395 and 1399.

References

Year of birth missing
Year of death missing
English MPs 1386
Members of the Parliament of England for Great Grimsby
English MPs 1395
English MPs 1399